Denis Sommer (born 23 September 1957) is a French politician of La République En Marche! (LREM) and Territories of Progress (TDP) who served as a member of the French National Assembly from 2017 to 2022, representing the department of Doubs.

Political career
Sommer was initially a member of the French Communist Party (PCF) and later of the Socialist Party (PS). He joined La République En Marche! (LREM) in 2017 and Territories of Progress (TDP) in 2020. In parliament, Sommer served as member of the Committee on Economic Affairs. In addition to his committee assignments, he was a member of the French Parliamentary Friendship Group with Bosnia-Herzegovina.

Political positions
In July 2019, Sommer decided not to align with his parliamentary group's majority and became one of 52 LREM members who abstained from a vote on the French ratification of the European Union’s Comprehensive Economic and Trade Agreement (CETA) with Canada.

See also
 2017 French legislative election

References

1957 births
Living people
People from Lure, Haute-Saône
French Communist Party politicians
Socialist Party (France) politicians
La République En Marche! politicians
Territories of Progress politicians
Deputies of the 15th National Assembly of the French Fifth Republic